In theoretical chemistry and molecular physics, Coulson–Fischer theory provides a quantum mechanical description of the electronic structure of molecules. The 1949 seminal work of Coulson and Fischer established a theory of molecular electronic structure which combines the strengths of the two rival theories which emerged soon after the advent of quantum chemistry - valence bond theory and molecular orbital theory, whilst avoiding many of their weaknesses. For example, unlike the widely used Hartree–Fock molecular orbital method, Coulson–Fischer theory provides a qualitatively correct description of molecular dissociative processes. The Coulson–Fischer wave function has been said to provide a third way in quantum chemistry. Modern valence bond theory is often seen as an extension of the Coulson–Fischer method.

Theory 
Coulson-Fischer theory is an extension of modern valence bond theory that uses localized atomic orbitals as the basis for VBT structures. In Coulson-Fischer Theory, orbitals are delocalized towards nearby atoms. This is described for H2 as follows:

where a and b are atomic 1s orbitals, that are used as the basis functions for VBT, and λ is a delocalization parameter from 0 to 1.

in obvious analogy to the Heitler-London wavefunction. However, an expansion of the Coulson-Fischer description of the wavefunction in terms of a and b gives:

A full VBT description of H2 that includes both ionic and covalent contributions is 

where ε and μ are constants between 0 and 1. 

As a result, the CF description gives the same description as a full valence bond description, but with just one VB structure.

References

External link 
 

Theoretical chemistry
Molecular physics
Electronic structure methods